Fever root is a common name for several plants and may refer to:

Ruellia tuberosa, native to Central America
Triosteum